is a 2021 Japanese live-action film based on the manga series of the same name by Nobuhiro Watsuki serving as the fourth installment of the Rurouni Kenshin film series following Rurouni Kenshin: The Legend Ends (2014). The film adapts the manga series' final arc, though some story elements differ. The film was produced simultaneously alongside the film series' fifth and final installment Rurouni Kenshin: The Beginning, which serves as a direct prequel to The Final, with flashback scenes being taken from The Beginning. Like previous movies, it was directed and written by Keishi Otomo.

The movie features the talents of Takeru Satoh, Emi Takei, Mackenyu Arata, Yusuke Iseya, Munetaka Aoki, Yū Aoi, Tao Tsuchiya, Ryunosuke Kamiki and Yōsuke Eguchi. The movie focuses on the Shangai mafia leader Yukishiro Enishi as he arranges multiple terrorist attacks to torment the former assassin Himura Kenshin as a revenge for killing his sister Yukishiro Tomoe during the Bakumatsu period. This leads to the eventual confrontation between the two lead and their allies. The movie is licensed by Netflix.

The movie was well received in the box office to the point it was one of the highest-grossing films in 2021. Critics praised the narrative focused on Kenshin's quest for redemption and his rivalry with the menacing Enishi. Although the plot has several changes to the original manga, it was noted to be true to the source's themes. The performances of Satoh and Mackenyu were praised, as were the choreographed fight scenes.

Plot 
The leader of the Shanghai mafia, Yukishiro Enishi, arrives in Tokyo to search for the former government assassin Himura Kenshin.  He and his allies, who all have a grudge with Kenshin, begin their assault on Tokyo. They first fire a cannon at the Akabeko restaurant, resulting in multiple casualties. Kenshin investigates the source of the attack, discovering a note with the written characters jinchū (人誅, lit. "man's judgment"). Later, Enishi sends one of his allies to destroy the Maekawa Dojo, and another one to the Chief of Police' home. After being alerted of the attacks, Sagara Sanosuke heads to the Maekawa Dojo whilst Kenshin rushes to check on the Chief of Police and defeats Enishi's ally. On his way back, Kenshin is confronted by Enishi, identifying himself as the instigator of all the attacks stating that his goal is for Kenshin to suffer the same pain he felt when Kenshin killed his sister, Yukishiro Tomoe.

Kenshin returns to the Kamiya Kasshin Ryu Dojo, revealing to Kamiya Kaoru, Sanosuke, Myojin Yahiko and Takani Megumi that fifteen years ago when he worked for the Imperialists he married Tomoe, who unbeknownst to him was a spy for the Shogunate. Her original intention was to kill Kenshin to avenge Akira Kiyosato, the one who gave Kenshin his first scar and Tomoe's late fiancé. However, the two fell in love, and got married. When the assassins whom she allied with tried to ambush Kenshin, Tomoe sacrificed herself to protect Kenshin, but was accidentally killed by Kenshin himself. Before her last breath, Tomoe held a knife and gave him his other scar, resulting in cross shaped scars he carries.

Oniwabanshu members Shinomori Aoshi and Makimachi Misao arrive in Tokyo to assist Kenshin while also bringing Tomoe's diary which had been left in a temple in Kyoto for safekeeping. Saito, and his police troops were sent on a trap set by Cho Sawagejo, revealed to be working with the Shanghai mafia. Hot air balloons are seen at the sky, spreading newspapers with jinchū written on them. Subsequently, Enishi's troops begin bombing various areas of Tokyo. During the attacks, Shinomori is wounded trying to shield people from an explosion, while Kenshin fights and defeats one of Enishi's allies, the man responsible for attacking the Akabeko restaurant. Meanwhile, Enishi arrives at the Kamiya Kasshin Dojo, beating up the dojo students and Sanosuke, then kidnapping Kaoru thereafter. Enishi is unable to kill Karou as she reminds him of his sister and the trauma of his sister's death.

Kenshin prepares to face Enishi and to redeem himself for Tomoe's death. Kenshin struggles as the mafia appears. Misao, Saito comes together with the police and the wounded Sanosuke to help Kenshin. Kenshin then enters Enishi's mansion where he encounters Wu Heishin and his guards, to whom Enishi has passed over the leadership of the Shanghai mafia. His former enemy Seta Sojiro appears, revealing he became a wanderer and from Kenshin's words, was able to move on from his past, prompting Sojiro to help Kenshin instead to repay his debt by holding the enemy at bay while Kenshin heads off to find Enishi. His enemy wants him to commit suicide for his sister's death and his sins as a former assassin. Kenshin relents, he will stop Enishi for his friends' and Tomoe's sake rather in order to repay for his sins. The two continue their battle with Kenshin besting Enishi. Heishin then appears and tries to kill Kenshin with a gun but Kaoru intervenes. Enishi protects Kaoru until Kenshin stops him, thanking him for protecting Kaoru.

In the aftermath, Enishi is arrested and breaks down in prison while reading Tomoe's diary sent by Kaoru as he finally understands his sister's final resolve. At the end, Kenshin and Kaoru visit Tomoe's grave to thank her, while holding each other's hands as they leave.

Cast

The live-action movie features the following actors:
Takeru Satoh as Himura Kenshin
Emi Takei as Kamiya Kaoru
Mackenyu Arata as Yukishiro Enishi
Kasumi Arimura as Yukishiro Tomoe
Yōsuke Eguchi as Saitō Hajime
Munetaka Aoki as Sagara Sanosuke
Yū Aoi as Takani Megumi
Yusuke Iseya as Shinomori Aoshi
Riku Ōnishi as Myōjin Yahiko
Tao Tsuchiya as Makimachi Misao
Ryōsuke Miura as Sawagejō Chō
Takuma Oto'o as Woo Heishin
Shingo Tsurumi as Chief Uramura
Takeo Nakahara as Maekawa Miyauchi
Mantarō Koichi as Kawaji Toshiyoshi
Shinnosuke Abe as Kujiranami Hyōgo
Shuntaro Yanagi as Otowa Hyōko
Joey Iwanaga as Inui Tenmon
Eiki Narita as Yatsume Mumyōi
Ryūnosuke Kamiki as Seta Sōjirō
With the exception of Kaito Ōyagi (Yahiko), all previous characters have the same actors from previous movies.

Production

Following the "Kyoto arc" duology films from the series, director Keishi Otomo noted there are also circumstances in which my own projects were progressing in various ways. So, first of all, they had the staff take the lead and proceed. Otomo started around the spring of 2018. He may have had to enter for a while. The script was quite difficult according to the director. In order to do that, I thought that in The Final, he had to draw Yukishiro Tomoe firmly. On the other hand, in this The Final, a doll that resembles Kaoru appears. He added it makes Kaoru think she is dead and pushes Kenshin into despair. Otomo think that it can be expressed without problems if it is a manga, but it is very difficult when it comes to live-action video. When thinking about it, Otomo thought that Enishi and Kenshin would fight for a woman named Tomoe, and that feeling was very strong. For Kenshin, Tomoe is a destined person and the only woman he loves which raised the tragic relationship between Kenhsin and Enishi. With such a part as the axis, a series of transcendental actions. Otomo's writing the script while having the idea of "let's compete with action as much as possible". In contrast to The Beginning, The Final has a Japanese-Western eclectic feel in the Meiji era, so the places with that atmosphere are a little limited.

Although based on the Jinchu arc from Rurouni Kenshin, Takeru Satoh explained in December 2020 that the movie would be different from the source material. He stated that he was worried whether manga author Nobuhiro Watsuki would like the film since it contains an original story. However, Watsuki sent him a letter in response that he was able to feel fully immersed in the world of the film. Satoh was relieved to hear Watsuki's thoughts on the film. The main theme of The Final is how Kenshin will live in the future. Satoh stated it was important for the movie to settle the fight against the edge, in regard to Kenshin's redemption. He further claims the highlight is the way of life of Kenshin.

Plans for another sequel had been revealed by Daily.co.jp on September 4, 2017, in connection the main actress Emi Takei's breach of contract due to her marriage with Exile band member Takahiro, as well as her pregnancy. Takei had agreements with up to 10 companies for commercials, including JTB and Yōfuku no Aoyama, and it was reported that her agreement with SSP might be terminated, with her commercial agreements with other companies being affected. Oscar Promotion, Takei's agency, apologized to its clients, and was negotiating penalties for breach of contract. The penalty for her breach of contract could have reached up to 1 billion yen (about US$9.11 million). The film was then planned to premiere in Japanese cinemas on July 3, 2020, but it was postponed to April 23, 2021, due to the recent COVID-19. Otomo commented the studio shut down after the government declared a state of emergency, so the entire production came to a halt. As a result, the staff could not do post-production work, prepare for the film's release, and other tasks. With the new release date, Otomo aims to raise the level of quality even more than before.

Rock band One Ok Rock provided the soundtrack song "Renegades" for the film.  In an interview with J Rock News, Moriuchi would express how the song connects to being the main theme for The Final, in which he would say that "Renegades" relates more to the protagonist than the overarching plot of the film.

Filming
This fourth entry was produced at the same period of time with the fifth entry. The film started shooting on November 4, 2018, and finished on June 28, 2019. Large-scale shooting for more than 7 months was carried out at 43 locations nationwide, including Kyoto, Nara, Shiga, Mie, Hyogo, Kumamoto, Hiroshima, Tochigi, Saitama, Shizuoka, Osaka, and Nagano. It utilized a total of 6,000 extras. During shooting of the film, Satoh faced the major difficulty of doing scenes where Kenshin battles a large amount of enemies by himself. There were several turns of the camera as these fights occurred in order to make the battles more appealing which made it more tiring than one on one battles but at the cost of becoming more tired. The final battle between Kenshin and Enishi had to be remade several times because Satoh got exhausted of moving four times in total. Satoh praised Arata's work as Enishi as he made the antagonist terrifying to the point the comical Kenshin acts with more tension in response to his threats which made him drop the signature sound effect "Oro". Arata also praised Satoh's works as he carried the franchise across several years in the live-action films.

Emi Takei took a diet to keep her body properly for Kaoru's character. Mackenyu, a fan of the Rurouni Kenshin installment, he could not hide his surprise when offered to play Enishi. Enishi is described as the series’ most feared enemy. To match his physique, Mackenyu worked out, but he focused on his mentality. As an actor he really happy that he was able to be part of a set where he can fully showcase his abilities. While performing the action scenes with Tanigaki and  his team, sometimes he suggested his own ideas for Enishi's movements. Other than the scenes with Kenshin, the scenes with Kaoru are a highlight. Mackenyu thinks the audience can see another side of Enishi. When they exchanged conversations, and his actions around her might show the character's depths as he revives his trauma of losing Tomoe. In regards to Rurouni Kenshin villains, he also wanted Enishi to look more menacing than the previous antagonist, Shishio Makoto. Ryūnosuke Kamiki returned to act as Seta Sojiro which surprised the media in general because his character was not present in the original manga.

Release 
The film premiered on April 23, 2021, in Japanese theaters.  All five films in the Rurouni Kenshin series were screened on the 24th Shanghai International Film Festival (SIFF), which was held on June 11–20, 2021. Rurouni Kenshin was the first Japanese live action series invited to be screened in Movie Franchise Section in Shanghai International Film Festival, which was newly established in 2016, while only Hollywood blockbuster franchises have been invited before. This was also the international premiere of The Final and The Beginning. The Final was released on Netflix on June 18, 2021, which included an English dub.

In Japan, the film was released on digital platforms on September 22, 2021, and on Blu-ray and DVD on October 13, 2021.

Reception

Box office
The work was released on 480 screens in 362 theaters nationwide from April 23, 2021. Due to the state of emergency, 63 buildings in Tokyo, Osaka, Hyogo, and Kyoto were closed from the 25th (64 in total from 26th and 67 in total from 27th). Despite that, the box office revenue of over 535 million yen (over 371,000 spectators) was recorded in the opening two days which became the No. 1 weekend opening box office in a live-action movie category released this year.

The film grossed 745 million yen (approximately US$6.9 million) the first three days of screening. In total, the film has grossed 4.34 billion yen (approximately US$37.8 million) at the Japanese box office.

Critical response
Critical response to The Final has generally positive. The Japan Times gave it three stars and a half with comments focused on its fight sequences and the conclusion it gives to Kenshin's arc. Decider also enjoyed the fight sequences and acting though he felt that Sanosuke's weak side might come across an unintentional hilarious during the final act. Nevertheless, the inclusion of Seta Sojiro was praised for Ryunosuke Kamiki's performance as the character became an aid to Kenshin and wants to see his resolution to his life as a pacifist while also enjoying the bigger focus on Misao and Saito. The romance between Kenshin and Kaoru was criticized though as being underdeveloped. Asian Movie Web felt the movie initially suffered from a slow pacing and that some characters have little roles in comparison to their previous works. Nevertheless, while there were changes in the script, the reviewer liked how Misao and Shinomori have more screen time and that the choreographer Kenji Tanigaki outdid himself in the making of the fights, most notably the ones involving Kenshin, Enishi and Sojiro. Fiction Horizon also noted while that there were several changes to the narrative, the essential themes focused on the manga were properly followed by the movie, most notably Kenshin's quest for redemption.

Several writers focused on Mackenyu's and Satoh's roles. Polygon as he claims that Mackenyu "brings tangible charisma to his screen persona" and how contrasting is his chaotic personality to the caring and relaxed Kenshin, giving further depths to the rivalry as they represented the chaos from the Meiji era. However, Anime News Network felt that Sanosuke and Enishi had little development when compared to their original manga personas. Fiction Horizon also noted Kenshin and Enishi's fight was well choreographed and served as a proper ending. Anime News Network liked the concept of Enishi's characterization due the new type of threat he brings to Kenshin not only due to his skills but whether or not the latter can bring him a solution to redeem himself for killing Tomoe during the events of Beginning. However, he lamented some cast members having minor roles in the narrative. Medium compared the threat provided to the Meiji era between Enishi and Shishio but felt that the latter was given a bigger threat to the peace in contrast to Enishi's schemes as it was more personal as a result of wanting revenge towards Kenshin. Kasumi Arimura and Mackenyu were also regarded by GamerFocus as the best actors in the movie due to how strong are their presence in the main character as well as their characterization. He praised the quality of the movie, regarding the original scenes as strong as the original narrative created by Watsuki and that Kenshin's character reached a proper ending after several films thanks to Satoh's performance.

Film School Rejects writer Rob Hunter listed the movie as the best action film of 2021.

References

External links
 Japanese official website
 

Japanese sequel films
Live-action films based on manga
Rurouni Kenshin films
Samurai films
Warner Bros. films
Films directed by Keishi Ōtomo
Films postponed due to the COVID-19 pandemic
Films scored by Naoki Satō
Films set in the 19th century
Films set in the Meiji period
Films shot in Hiroshima
Films shot in Japan
Films shot in Kyoto
Films shot in Osaka
2010s Japanese films